The Pakistan national cricket team toured New Zealand in January and February 1973 and played a three-match Test series against the New Zealand national cricket team. Pakistan won the series 1-0. It was their first Test series win outside Pakistan. In addition, a Limited Overs International (LOI) took place between the second and third Tests; this match was the inaugural LOI of both teams.

Touring team

 Intikhab Alam (captain)
 Asif Iqbal
 Asif Masood
 Azmat Rana
 Majid Khan
 Majid Usman
 Masood Iqbal
 Mushtaq Mohammad
 Nasim-ul-Ghani
 Pervez Sajjad
 Sadiq Mohammad
 Saleem Altaf
 Sarfraz Nawaz
 Talat Ali
 Wasim Bari
 Wasim Raja
 Zaheer Abbas

Azmat Rana and Wasim Raja had replaced Mohammad Ilyas and Saeed Ahmed after the Australian leg of the tour.

Test series summary
1st Test

2nd Test

3rd Test

ODI match
{{Limited overs matches|
  | date = February 11, 1973
  | team1 = 
  | score1 = 187 (38.3 overs)
  | score2 = 165 (33.3 overs)
  | team2 = 
  | runs1 = Mark Burgess 47 (68)
  | wickets1 = Sarfraz Nawaz 4/46 (7.3 overs)
  | runs2 = Sadiq Mohammad 37 (50)
  | wickets2 = Dayle Hadlee 4/34 (8 overs)
  | result =  won by 22 runs
  | report = scorecardreport
  | toss = Pakistan won the toss and decided to field
  | venue = Lancaster Park, Christchurch
  | umpires = F.R. Goodall (NZ) & E.G. Wainscott (NZ)|
  | rain =
  | notes = This was the first ever ODI match for Pakistan and New Zealand.
Peter Coman, Glenn Turner, Bevan Congdon, Brian Hastings, Mark Burgess, Graham Vivian, Ken Wadsworth, Dayle Hadlee, Richard Hadlee, Hedley Howarth, Richard Collinge (NZ), Intikhab Alam, Sadiq Mohammad, Majid Khan, Mushtaq Mohammad, Asif Iqbal, Wasim Raja, Nasim-ul-Ghani, Wasim Bari, Saleem Altaf, Sarfraz Nawaz and Asif Masood (Pak) all made their ODI debuts.New Zealand registered their first ever ODI win.}}

References

External links
 Pakistan tour of New Zealand 1973, Wisden 1974'', R.T. Brittenden on ESPN Cricinfo

1973 in Pakistani cricket
1973 in New Zealand cricket
1972-73
International cricket competitions from 1970–71 to 1975
New Zealand cricket seasons from 1970–71 to 1999–2000